Joppa is a hamlet in South Ayrshire, Scotland, about  west of Coylton and  east of Belston, on the A70 road.

Footballer Archie Hunter was born in Joppa in 1859.

Lochend Loch lies above Joppa near to Lochend Farm and Gallowhill.

References

External links
 

Villages in South Ayrshire